Neptunocene, Np(C8H8)2, is an organoneptunium compound composed of a neptunium atom sandwiched between two cyclooctatetraenide (COT2-) rings. As a solid it has a dark brown/red colour but it appears yellow when dissolved in chlorocarbons, in which it is sparingly soluble. The compound is quite air-sensitive.

It was one of the first organoneptunium compounds to be synthesised, and is a member of the actinocene family of actinide-based metallocenes.

Structure 
The sandwich structure of neptunocene has been determined by single crystal XRD. The COT2- rings are found to be planar with 8 equivalent C–C bonds of 1.385 Å length, and sit parallel in an eclipsed conformation. The Np–COT distance (to the ring centroid) is 1.909 Å and the individual Np–C distances are 2.630 Å.

Neptunocene assumes a monoclinic crystal structure (P21/n space group) which is isomorphous to uranocene and thorocene but not to plutonocene.

Synthesis and properties 
Neptunocene was first synthesised in 1970 by reacting neptunium(IV) chloride (NpCl4) with dipotassium cyclooctatetraenide (K2(C8H8)) in diethyl ether or THF:

 NpCl4 + 2 K2(C8H8) → Np(C8H8)2 + 4 KCl

The same reaction conditions have been routinely reproduced since then for the synthesis of the compound.

The three actinocenes uranocene, neptunocene, and plutonocene share virtually identical chemistry: they do not react in the presence of water or dilute base, but are very air-sensitive, quickly forming oxides. All three are only slightly soluble (up to about 10−3 M concentrations) in aromatic or chlorinated solvents such as benzene, toluene, carbon tetrachloride or chloroform.

References

Neptunium compounds
Organoactinide compounds
Metallocenes